Christopher Winter (fl. 1716–1723) was an English pirate active in the Caribbean. He is best known for sailing in Spanish service and launching the career of Edward England.

History
Winter was active in the Nassau, Bahamas area in 1716. The following year King George offered a pardon to all pirates who surrendered within a year. Winter kept active, capturing a merchant ship near Jamaica and forcing one of its crewmen, Edward England, into piracy. England embraced piracy and Winter returned with him to the Republic of Pirates on New Providence.

Finally electing not to accept the pardon, Winter sailed with Nicholas Brown to Cuba where they converted to Catholicism and signed on as guarda costa privateers with the Spanish. Winter began attacking English ships and settlements off Jamaica, raiding them for slaves which he took back to Cuba. Governor Nicholas Lawes of Jamaica complained to Spanish officials in Trinidad and Cuba and even sent the warship  to demand the return of Winter, Brown, and the ships and slaves they’d captured. The Spanish sheltered Winter and Brown, claiming “as for those English Fugitives you mention, they are here as other Subjects of our Lord the King, being brought voluntarily to our holy Catholick Faith, and have received the Water of Baptism.”

Winter is recorded as active in Spanish service through 1723; despite being called among “the most notorious rogues and renegades of all,” his further activities are not known, and he “otherwise remains a footnote in history.”

See also
Charles Vane, Edward England’s captain after leaving Winter, and who also reneged on the King’s pardon

References

18th-century pirates
Year of birth missing
Year of death missing
British pirates
Caribbean pirates
Pardoned pirates